Schedophilus medusophagus is a species of fish belonging to the family Centrolophidae.

Its native range is Europe, Atlantic Ocean, Africa.

References

Centrolophidae
Fish described in 1839